Charles Augustus Freiberg (May 23, 1887 – May 5, 1941) was an American businessman and politician from New York.

Life
Freiberg was born on May 23, 1887, in Buffalo, New York. He attended Public School No. 24, and Central High School there.

He was General Manager of the Buffalo Cement Company, and President of the Amherst Stone Company and the Duane Construction Corporation.

Freiberg was a member of the New York State Assembly (Erie Co., 1st D.) in 1923, 1924, 1925 and 1926.

He was a member of the New York State Senate (50th D.) from 1927 to 1929, sitting in the   150th, 151st and 152nd New York State Legislature; and was Chairman of the Committee on Revision in 1927, and the Committee on Canals from 1928 to 1929. He resigned his seat in September 1929, to run for Sheriff of Erie County.

He was Sheriff of Erie County from 1930 to 1932.

He died on May 5, 1941 from a heart attack, at his home in Buffalo, New York.

References

1887 births
1941 deaths
Republican Party New York (state) state senators
Politicians from Buffalo, New York
Republican Party members of the New York State Assembly
Sheriffs of Erie County, New York
20th-century American politicians